Theatre Night is the umbrella title under which adaptations of classic and contemporary stage plays were usually broadcast on BBC 2 between 15 September 1985 and 21 July 1990.

List of episodes
The main source for compiling this list was the BFI Film and TV Database. The website's master list is here. IMDb was also used, but some significant errors were found; these are noted,

Legend: Se = Season; Ep = Episode

References

External links
 

1985 British television series debuts
1990 British television series endings
1980s British drama television series
1990s British drama television series
BBC television dramas
1980s British anthology television series
1990s British anthology television series
English-language television shows